Manfred Krankl is a winemaker and founder of Sine Qua Non (wine), a California winery that is known for its wines made from blends of Rhône grape varietals, a tendency to avoid repetition, and very limited production of wines that are difficult to obtain. Krankl was born in Austria and moved to the United States in 1980, subsequently founding Sine Qua Non in 1993 with his wife Elaine.

See also
Rhone Rangers

References

American winemakers
Living people

Year of birth missing (living people)